On June 25, 2006, Michael Julius Ford, 22,  went on a shooting spree in a Safeway warehouse in Denver, Colorado, killing one and injuring five before he was shot and killed by police.

Attack
On the afternoon of June 25, Ford went to the Safeway warehouse where he was employed. At 3:12, he started randomly shooting his fellow employees with a long-barreled handgun. Mauricio DeHaro, 32, was killed in the shooting. Mark Moran, 37, John Mendoza, 27, Luis Relford, 34, Oscar Martinez, 27, and police officer Derick Dominguez were injured. All those injured were hospitalized, though Martinez was released shortly after being treated. Moran was shot in the head; Relford was shot in the wrist; Mendoza was shot in the face; and Dominguez was shot in the hip.

After the shooting began, police, including SWAT personnel, responded to the shooting and arrived at 3:24. The police began searching for Ford in the warehouse, where he had set several small fires. 68 minutes after the police entered the warehouse, Ford ambushed them, before the police had an opportunity to talk with the shooter. Officer Derick Dominguez was wounded at this time. The police returned fire and killed Ford.

Attacker
Ford was a graduate of Montbello High School. He began working at Safeway in February 2005.

References

1980s births
2006 deaths
People from Denver
Deaths by firearm in Colorado
American murderers
People shot dead by law enforcement officers in the United States
Year of birth missing